The New Zealand Commerce and Industry Office (Māori: Te Mata O Aorere) represents New Zealand interests in Taiwan in the absence of formal diplomatic relations, functioning as a de facto embassy.   

The Office was established in 1989. It is a subsidiary of the Wellington Employers' Chamber of Commerce, but is staffed by officers either employed directly by the Office or seconded from relevant New Zealand departments and agencies. These include the Ministry of Foreign Affairs and Trade.

Before 1972, New Zealand recognised Taiwan as the "Republic of China", but diplomatic relations were ended following the decision of the government of 
Norman Kirk to recognise the People's Republic of China, making it one of the first developed countries to do so. 

Its counterpart in New Zealand is the Taipei Economic and Cultural Office in New Zealand in Wellington.

References

External links
 

Taipei
1989 establishments in Taiwan
Representative Offices in Taipei
Organizations established in 1989
Foreign trade of New Zealand